In the context of transit in New York, the Brown Line may refer to:

 Either of the New York City Subway services that use the BMT Nassau Street Line and its branches:
 J Nassau Street Local
 Z Nassau Street Express

 The Far Rockaway Branch of the Long Island Rail Road